This is a list of earthquakes in 1930. Only magnitude 6.0 or greater earthquakes appear on the list. Lower magnitude events are included if they have caused death, injury or damage. Events which occurred in remote areas will be excluded from the list as they wouldn't have generated significant media interest. All dates are listed according to UTC time. Many earthquakes caused deaths and destruction of property. Italy and Iran bore the brunt of the casualties. Several events occurred in Burma, Japan, China and Tajikistan among others.

Overall

By death toll 

 Note: At least 10 casualties

By magnitude 

 Note: At least 7.0 magnitude

Notable events

January

February

March

April

May

June

July

August

September

October

November

December

References

1930
 
1930